Bavegem is a village in the Denderstreek in East Flanders in Belgium, part of the municipality of Sint-Lievens-Houtem.

A specific landscape is the classified and protected landscape around "de oude linde", between Bavegem, Vlierzele and Oordegem.

Bevegem is the hometown of Inex, a large diary company.

The neighbouring villages are:
Vlierzele
Oordegem
Oosterzele
Sint-Lievens-Houtem
Letterhoutem

Gallery

References

External links 
 

Sint-Lievens-Houtem
Populated places in East Flanders